Sydney Showground Stadium (Known commercially as GIANTS Stadium during the AFL Season) is a sports and events stadium located at the Sydney Showground in Sydney Olympic Park. It hosted the baseball events for the 2000 Summer Olympics. The Showground, including the stadium, is operated by the Royal Agricultural Society of NSW (RAS), under lease from the New South Wales Government.

The stadium hosts flagship events of the Sydney Royal Easter Show, such as the Grand Parade. The stadium is also used for sport. It is the primary home ground of the Australian Football League's Greater Western Sydney Giants and the home ground of the Big Bash League's Sydney Thunder. It was also the primary home ground of the A-League's Western Sydney Wanderers for 3 years starting with the 2016–17 A-League season. Events and festivals to have been held at the stadium include Soundwave, Big Day Out, Stereosonic and Big Exo Day.

The stadium opened in 1998 as the Sydney Showground Main Arena. In conjunction with an expansion and upgrade in 2011–12, it was renamed Sydney Showground Stadium.

History

The stadium was constructed as part of the development of the new Sydney Showground, it was built to replace the ageing Showground at Moore Park and to provide a venue for the 2000 Summer Olympics.

A$65 million upgrade of the stadium to accommodate the GWS Giants was announced on 9 June 2010. Jointly funded by the NSW Government, the AFL and the RAS, the upgrade included two new stands which increased seating capacity from 13,000 to 25,000 (the stadium seated 13,000 but its full pre-redevelopment capacity was listed as 21,500), upgraded hospitality facilities, improved audio and sound systems and new media facilities. The playing surface was also reconfigured. The upgrade was officially opened on 23 May 2012.

The RAS is seeking funding from the New South Wales Government to expand the stadium as part of a major upgrade of the Showground precinct. It has targeted a total post-extension capacity of 30,000 seats but is considering revising the target capacity to 35,000 seats.

Following its redevelopment, the venue was known as Škoda Stadium from 2012 until 2013 in a deal with car manufacturer Škoda, then as Spotless Stadium from 2014 until 2018 in a deal with cleaning and catering company Spotless Group Holdings. Since 2019, it has been known as GIANTS Stadium in a deal with its primary AFL tenant, the Greater Western Sydney Giants, making the club the only one on the league to play in a self-branded venue; the 'GIANTS' name is styled in capital letters, consistent with the manner in which the club self-styles its name in all media.

Australian rules football

The venue is the primary home ground for The Greater Western Sydney Giants. The club played their first game at the stadium on Saturday, 26 May 2012, Round 9 of the 2012 AFL season. In front of a crowd of 11,887 the Giants lost the match against  by 66 points. The Giants first win at the stadium occurred on 4 August that year, when they defeated  by 34 points.

Cricket
The Sydney Thunder played two games at the stadium during the 2014–15 Big Bash League season when ANZ Stadium was unavailable due to the 2015 AFC Asian Cup. In June 2015, the Sydney Thunder announced a 10-year agreement to play all home games at Sydney Showground Stadium until the 2024–25 BBL season.

The opening Sydney Derby of the fifth season (2015–16) of BBL attracted record audience, with more than 1.5 million people tuning in for this match between the Sydney Thunder and the Sydney Sixers. On 28 December 2015, Sydney Thunder defeated Adelaide Strikers at the stadium in front of 21,500 spectators.

The stadium hosted several games of the 2020 ICC Women's T20 World Cup.

Soccer

The Western Sydney Wanderers played most of their homes games at the stadium during the 2016–17 A-League season while Parramatta Stadium was rebuilt. Home games against Sydney FC, Melbourne Victory and Perth Glory were played at the nearby ANZ Stadium. The Wanderers played their first home game at the ground on 23 October 2016 against the Newcastle Jets.

Baseball and 2000 Olympics
The stadium hosted the Sydney Storm in the Australian Baseball League for the 1998 and 1999 championship. During the Olympics, it was known as the Sydney Baseball Stadium and was the main baseball venue. The gold medal game played in front of 14,107 saw the USA, managed by Tommy Lasorda, a former two time World Series winning manager with the Los Angeles Dodgers, defeated defending champions Cuba 4–0 to win their first ever Olympic gold medal in baseball.

Since the Olympics, no other baseball game has been played at the venue. Other Olympic events hosted were the riding and running portion of the modern pentathlon competitions.

Rugby league
In 2001, the Canterbury Bulldogs of the NRL moved their home games to the stadium, playing there until 2005 when they moved to ANZ Stadium.

Rugby sevens
The Showground became the new home of Australia's events in the men's and women's versions of the World Rugby Sevens Series effective with the 2018–19 seasons. This change was made because the Sydney Football Stadium, previously host to both events, is to be demolished to make way for a new stadium on the same site.

Motorsport
In the tradition of the Sydney Showground Speedway at Moore Park which ran speedway from 1926 until 1996, the track was used as a Speedway venue, mostly for motorcycle racing, though with limited success. In 2007 and 2008 the Stadium hosted a round of the Australian Solo Championships, just as the old Showground had done on 21 separate occasions between 1935 and 1980. The 2007 championship round, which was the opening round of a five-round series, was won by Australia's reigning Speedway World Champion Jason Crump, the son of Phil Crump who won the Australian title at the old Showground in 1975. Jason Crump would go on to win his second Aussie title in 2007, winning three of the five rounds (Sydney, Newcastle Showgrounds, and Borderline Speedway in Mount Gambier), while finishing second in Mildura (Olympic Park Speedway) and the Gillman Speedway in Adelaide.

The track, which was tight and narrow (a criticism in common with its predecessor) and almost square in shape, was also used for Speedcar racing, also with little success. When the Speedcars raced at the Showground, a temporary fence was put in place on the inside of the track to protect the grass surface from any out of control cars.

The first speedway meeting at the new Showground was held on 1 May 1999 and included an unofficial Solo "Test" between Australia and the United States, won easily by Australia. The program also featured Sidecars, as well as demonstration runs by restored vintage Speedcars and Modifieds which had raced at the old Showground. The speedway was officially opened by 15 time World Champion Ivan Mauger of New Zealand, and the "King of the Royale" (the old Showground Speedway), four time Australian Solo Champion Jim Airey.

Configuration
In its present configuration, the stadium is a playing field running north east to south west. The south western half is surrounded by a single grandstand structure. Additional stands are located on either side of the field, directly adjacent the main structure. A single video screen is located at the north-eastern end. When it was installed, the screen was the largest at a stadium in the southern hemisphere,  
The stands are:

Opened 1998:
Members Stand
Suttor Stand
Vincent Fairfax Stand
Sinclair Stand
Martin & Angus Stand
Opened 2012:
Sydney Royal Stand
Cumberland Stand

AFL records
Players
 Most games played: Callan Ward (/), 51
 Most goals kicked: Jeremy Cameron (/), 127

Teams
 Highest score:  29.13 (187) defeated  7.10 (52), 12 May 2013
 Lowest score:  4.2 (26) defeated by  20.14 (134), 9 June 2018
 Biggest margin:  defeated , 135 points, 12 May 2013
 Longest winning streak:  (2015–6), 6 games

Last updated: 4 July 2018

Attendance records

Top 10 sports attendance records

Source: Austadiums (2003 crowds onwards)

Top 5 AFL attendance records

Source: AFL Tables

Top 5 BBL attendance records

Source Austadiums

Top 5 NRL attendance records

Last updated on 1 January 2017

See also

 2000 Summer Olympics venues
 List of sports venues in Australia

References

External links
 

 AFL Attendance Records
 NRL Attendance Records

Sports venues in Sydney
Multi-purpose stadiums in Australia
Australian Football League grounds
Cricket grounds in New South Wales
Baseball venues in Australia
Olympic baseball venues
Music venues in Sydney
Venues of the 2000 Summer Olympics
Olympic modern pentathlon venues
Defunct speedway venues in Australia
Rugby league stadiums in Australia
Women's Big Bash League
North East Australian Football League grounds
Sydney Olympic Park
Soccer venues in Sydney
World Rugby Sevens Series venues